Os Mutantes: Caminhos do Coração (The Mutants: Pathways of the Heart) is a Brazilian telenovela which originally aired on Rede Record.

Plot
The first season of its predecessor, Caminhos do Coração, contains:
 The revelation of the mystery of Maria's kidnapping 
 The discovery of the identity of the person responsible for the crimes of the bankrupt biotech company Progênese
 The transformation of Julia Zaccarias into Juli Di Trevi, her identity after receiving a rejuvenating serum
 The disclosure of Mariana, mother of twins Maria and Samira

Men and women are transformed into vampires, cats, snakes, spiders and werewolves, which attack the streets of São Paulo and disseminate evil as an epidemic. The terrified population pursues the mutants.

Maria and Marcelo meet the League of Good (composed of Noah, Cleo, Tony, Bobby, Janet, Vavá, Pachola, Perpétua, Leonor, Lúcio, Bianca, Juno, Tati, Kaspar, Ágata, Aquiles, Cris, Yara, Nathy, Valente, Simone, Newton, Marisa, Willie, Erica, Eugene, Angela and Clare) in the  Mayer family mansion, which becomes the refuge and headquarters of the healthy mutants.

Samira, the twin sister of Maria (trapped in Dr. Júlia's laboratory since her birth 30 years ago), is reported dead. Samira is the most-powerful and evil mutant, since she can absorb the powers of other mutants. She is the right arm of Dr. Júlia Zaccarias, who transforms into Dr. Juli Di Trevi and aims to exterminate all who thwart her.

DEPECOM
DEPECOM (DEpartamento de PEsquisa e COntrole de Mutantes, (Department of Research and Control of Mutants) is restructured, and uses the latest technology to stop the mutants. DEPECOM is divided into two wings. One is composed of Marcelo, Miguel, Aline, Marta, Beto and Ernesto, who want to imprison the violent and preserve the peaceful. They investigate the Evil League (composed of Juli, Samira, Gór, Taveira, Eric, Metamorpho, Fernando, Ariadne, Draco and Telê), organized in São Paulo, and their commanders Juli and Gó. This wing gathers mutant gray wolves, vampires, werewolves, snakes, spiders and other dangerous creatures. The second wing is represented by Fredo and Adolfo, who want to exterminate all mutants (including the peaceful).

The Mystery of Valente
Valente discovers confidential information in the Omega File which reveals that Julia is an alien, and pays the price for his discoveries. Attacked by Fredo and his followers, he loses his memory. Valente has only one portfolio, with papers, cards and documents. He is saved by Gabriela, a doctor. While he tries to unravel the mystery of his own past, he is pursued by Fredo (who wants to kill Valente before his own past comes to light).

Nati, a vampire bitten by Taveira but who has a conscience, will help Valente to find out who he is. She is not affiliated with the Evil League, and is persecuted for exercising her free will and sharing passion with Valente. Nati's good nature overcomes her contamination, and she joins the League of Good.

Saving babies, saving the world
Janete's powers evolve. She can see into the future, and discovers that the survival of humanity depends on the survival of the children of Lúcio and Bianca. Those children must be protected, or humanity will be dominated by vicious mutants.

Bianca and Leonor are sent to Arraial Island with their babies and join the League of Good. Juli discovers Janete's premonition, and attacks the babies and their mothers (who are protected by the League of Good) with members of the Evil League.

Journey to the center of the earth
Trying to save Lúcio and Juno's babies in the island's tunnels, Maria, Noé, Beto, Perpétua, Cléo and Toni are attacked by mutant insects, the Ant Men, Tarantula Men and giant spiders. Beto and Perpétua escape, but the others are captured by the Carpenter Ant Men and brought to Agartha. The Ant Queen tells them they are in Shangri-La, the Agarthan capital at the center of the earth.

Juno and Lúcio return to Melquior, the prince of Agartha, who leads the League of Good in the fight against the reptilian aliens and the Evil League. If they join the reptilian army and the Evil League, humanity will perish but; if the babies join the League of Good, humanity will prevail and the reptilians will be defeated.

Vampire League
The mutant vampire Dracula and his lieutenant, Bram, find the former headquarters of the League of Evil and take it over. They recruit vampires to form the Vampire League, a branch of the League of Evil which hosts blood-drinking parties. Nati, a vampire, ends their thirst for destruction.

Cast

Main
 Bianca Rinaldi - Maria dos Santos Luz Mayer Duarte Montenegro and Samira Mayer Zaccarias
 Leonardo Vieira - Marcelo Duarte Montenegro
 Babi Xavier - Juli di Trevi
 Petrônio Gontijo - Fredo Cavalcanti
 Marcos Pitombo - José da Silva Valente (Valente)
 Maytê Piragibe - Natália (Nati)
 Liliana Castro - Janete Fontes Martinelli (Jan)
 Gabriel Braga Nunes - Sigismundo Taveira (Taveira)
 Tuca Andrada - Eric Fusili (Lobão)
 Julianne Trevisol - Gorgon (Gor)
 Carolina Holanda - Dra. Gabriela
 Maurício Ribeiro - Cristiano Pena (Cris)
 Felipe Folgosi -Roberto Duarte Montenegro (Beto/Enigma)
 Paulo Nigro - Antônio Mayer (Toni)
 Giselle Policarpo - Cléo Mayer
 Rafaela Mandelli - Regina Mayer
 Cláudio Heinrich - Danilo Mayer (Danilinho / Dan)
 André de Biase - Aristóteles Mayer (Ari)
 Angelina Muniz - Cassandra Fontes Martinelli
 Sacha Bali - Matheus Morpheus Mayer(Metamorfo)
 Lígia Fagundes - Leonor Batista
 Nanda Ziegler - Bianca Fischer
 Milena Ferrari - Aline Reis
 Jonathan Haagensen - Miguel Ângelo
 André Segatti - Ernesto Justo
 Rômulo Estrela - Draco
 Rômulo Arantes Neto - Telê
 Élcio Monteze - Príncipe Melquior
 Fernando Pavão -Noel Machado (Noé)
 Patrícia de Jesus - Perpétua Salvador
 Louise D'Tuani - Rainha Isis de Almeida Solar Donato
 Théo Becker - Fernando(Homem Cobra)
 Zé Dumont - Teófilo Magalhães (Mar / Guerreiro da Luz)
 Flávia Monteiro -Viviane Menezes (Vivi)
 Taumaturgo Ferreira -Tarcísio Batista (Batista)
 Cláudia Alencar - Sandra Gisa de Albuquerque Andrade
 Raul Gazola - João Ricardo Borba Gato de Albuquerque Andrade
 Pedro Nercessian - Tarso de Albuquerque Andrade
 Thiago Gagliasso - Gaspar
 Paloma Bernardi - Luna Reis
 Carla Regina - Ant Queen
 Suyane Moreira - Iara
 Karen Junqueira - Furia
 Mário Frias - Lino Rodrigues (Dracula)
 André Mattos -Paulo Pachola (Pachola)
 Andréa Avancini - Érica Menezes Figueira
 Helena Xavier - Simone dos Santos (mulher Dona pouco)
 Rocco Pitanga - Armando Carvalho (Carvalho)
 Antônio Pitanga -Newton Carvalho (Nil)
 Marina Miranda - Marisa Gama
 Arthur Lopes - Luciano Men (Iluminado)
 Diego Christo - Hélio Bezerra
 Lívia Rossy - Ceres
 Diogo Oliveira - Carpenterant
 Carolina Magalhães - Carol Verdi
 Joaquim de Castro - Adolfo
 Marcelo Reis - Bram
 André Santinho - Tarantula Men
 Paulo Reis - Kidor
 Jorge Pontual - Felipe
 Felipe Adler - Nightmare (Pesadelo)
 Jean Beppe - Typhon (Homem-Tufão)

Youth
 Letícia Medina - Tatiana Duarte Montenegro (Tati)
 Sérgio Malheiros - Aquiles Magalhães
 Juliana Xavier - Ágata Magalhães
 Pedro Malta - Eugênio Menezes Figueira (Genius Small)
 Shaila Arsene - Clara Menezes Figueira (Clarinha / Iluminação)
 Júlia Maggessi - Ângela Menezes Figueira (Small Angel)
 Cássio Ramos - Valfredo Pachola (Vavá / Wolfboy)
 Sofia Rezende - Juno
 Cézar Augusto Neto - Lúcio

Guest appearances

 Miriam Freeland - Marta Pureza
 Daniel Aguiar - Vladmir Pereira (Vlado)
 Lana Rodes - Esmeralda Nascimento Justo
 Eduardo Lago - Luís Guilherme Batista Figueira (Guiga)
 Myriam Pérsia - Mariana Mayer
 Natália Guimarães - Ariadne
 Fernanda Nobre -Lúcia Rocha Mayer (Lucinha)
 Fafá de Belém - Ana Gabriela dos Santos Luz (Ana Luz)
 Perfeito Fortuna - Pepe Luz
 Ítala Nandi -  Júlia Zaccarias
 Jean Fercondini - Lucas Fontes Martinelli
 Helder Agostini - Demétrio
 Andréa Leal - Rosa Encarnada 
 Patrycia Travassos - Irma Mayer
 Ângelo Paes Leme - Rodrigo Mayer
 Mônica Carvalho - Amália Fortunato Mayer
 Sebastião Vasconcellos - Mauro Fontes
 Preta Gil - Helga Silva da Silveira
 Cássio Scapin - Dr. César Rubicão (hologram)
 Daniel Andrade - José 
 Java Mayam - Joca
 Allan Souza Lima - Meduso Mayer
 Fausto Maule - Lupo
 Marcos Suhre -Homem de Gelo
 José Loreto - Scorpio
 Jonathan Nogueira - Paglia Souza
 Nill Marcondes - Breno
 Françoise Forton- Cristna Dorange, Juiza Estela Dorange
 Rogério Fabiano - Ezequiel Gottardo
 Sebastião Lemos - José (outlaw, vagabond)
 Bernardo Castro Alves - Rico
 Alexandre Machafer - Tsepes
 Gabriel Azevedo - Stoker
 Cláudio Andrade - Heraldo
 Danilo Sacramento - Quim
 Lorenzo Martin - DEPECOM officer
 Ulisses Silveira - Nosferatu

Soundtrack

 Musical producer: Daniel Figueiredo
 Musical director: Marcio Antonucci
 "Planeta Sonho" - 14 Bis (opening theme 1)
 "Planeta Sonho" - Milton Nascimento (opening theme 2)
 "Maria, Maria" - Roupa nova (Maria's theme)
 "Grande Amor" - Fafá de Belém (Maria and Marcelo's theme)
 "Raça" - Fafá de Belém and Milton Nascimento (Esmeralda and Ernesto's theme)
 "Mutantes Depois" - Os Mutantes (Tarso theme)
 "Canto de la terra" - Sarah Brightman and Andrea Bocelli (Nati and Valente's theme)
 "Quem Sabe Um Dia a Gente Se Vê" - Donna Lolla (Fredo and Marta's theme)
 "Rosa Dos Ventos" - Chico Buarque (League of Good theme)
 "Sonho de Ícaro" - Ricky Vallen (children's theme)
 "Bilhete" - Ivan Lins (Vivi's theme)
 "Reencontro" - Rosana Fiengo and Rodrigo Faro (Kaspar and Luna's theme)
 "João e Maria" - Chico Buarque and Branca Lima (Eugênio and Ágata's theme)
 "Show That Girl" - Yasmin Gontijo and Feio (Gor and Metamorpho's theme)
 "Tu Quieres Mi Churros" - Os Virgens (Dr. Gabriela's theme)
 "Robocop Gay" - Mamonas Assassinas (Danilo's theme)
 "Sexo" - Oswaldo Montenegro (Fernando and Ariadne's theme)
 "The Game of Life" - Scorpions (League of Evil theme)

See also
List of vampire television series

References

External links
Official website

Informações sobre o elenco da segunda temporada

2008 telenovelas
2008 Brazilian television series debuts
2009 Brazilian television series endings
Brazilian LGBT-related television shows
Brazilian telenovelas
Portuguese-language telenovelas
Brazilian mystery television series
Post-apocalyptic television series
RecordTV telenovelas
Brazilian science fiction television series
Vampires in television
Television about werewolves
Television series about shapeshifting
Television series about mutants